Kyungpook National University School of Medicine (commonly referred to as KNU Med or KNU School of Medicine) is the medical school of Kyungpook National University in Daegu, South Korea. Founded in 1923, it is the second-oldest medical school in South Korea after Yonsei University College of Medicine. It is considered as one of the most prestigious medical school in South Korea. KNU Med offers the MD, MD-PhD, MSc and PhD degrees in medicine. Each class in the four-year MD program has approximately 110 students.

History 
KNU School of Medicine officially traces its origins to Daegu Medical Academy affiliated with Daegu Charity Hospital in 1923, making it the second-oldest medical school in South Korea. The school was renamed the KNU School of Medicine in 1951.

Academics

Degree Programs 
Degree programs offered by KNU School of Medicine:
 Doctor of Medicine (MD)
 MD-PhD
 Master of Science (MS)
 Doctor of Philosophy (PhD)

Curriculum

Programs

See also 
 Kyungpook National University
 List of medical schools in South Korea

References

External links 
 

Medicine
Medical schools in South Korea
Educational institutions established in 1923
1923 establishments in Korea